Lung cancer susceptibility 5 is a protein that in humans is encoded by the LNCR5 gene.

References 

Genes